Aayiram Kannudayaal is a 1986 Indian Tamil-language film directed by K. Shankar for Sasivarnam Films, produced by R. Jambunaathan. It stars Padmini, Jeevitha, Prabha and Baby Shalini.

Plot

Cast 

 Padmini
 Jeevitha
 Prabha
 Baby Shalini
 Rajeev
 Swarnamukhi
 M. N. Nambiar
 V. K. Ramasamy
 Senthil
 Loose Mohan
 Heran Ramasamy
 Manorama
 Gandhimathi
 Vani
 Mohanapriya
 Kumari Indira
 Suganthi
 Raji
 T. K. S. Saraswathi
 Baby Lakshmi
 Ennatha Kannaiya
 LIC Narasimhan
 Shankar–Ganesh in special appearance

Soundtrack
Soundtrack was composed by Shankar–Ganesh.
"Aayiram Kunnudaiyaal" - Vani Jairam, Sirkazhi G. Sivachidambaram
"Maatharin Kungumam" - Vani Jairam
"Sirikkatthaane" - K. S. Chithra
"Amma Thaaye" - P. Susheela, Vani Jairam
"Vaigai Karai Meenakshi" - Vani Jairam
"Oru Kodi" - K. J. Yesudas

Reception
Jayamanmadhan of Kalki felt that Rajeev's acting of keeping straight face till the end was a new lesson he taught to the audience and also added Padmini, Nambiar, Manorama did not have proper roles and concluded that since it is directed by legendary director K. Shankar so only old glory can be told now otherwise nothing special.

References

1980 films
1986 films
1980s Tamil-language films
Films scored by Shankar–Ganesh
Films directed by K. Shankar
Hindu devotional films